The World Cyber Games 2007 was held in Seattle, Washington, held at the Qwest Field Event Center, the second time the WCG was held in an American location. It ran from October 3–7, 2007, and featured over 700 players from more than 70 different countries.

Official games

PC games

 Age of Empires III: The WarChiefs
 Carom3D
 Command & Conquer 3: Tiberium Wars
 FIFA 07
 Counter-Strike 1.6
 Need for Speed: Carbon
 StarCraft: Brood War
 Warcraft III: The Frozen Throne

Xbox 360 games 

 Dead or Alive 4
 Gears of War
 Project Gotham Racing 3
 Tony Hawk's Project 8

Results

References 

World Cyber Games events
2007 in esports
2007 in sports in Washington (state)
2007 in American sports
International esports competitions hosted by the United States